An opening ceremony, grand opening, or ribbon-cutting ceremony marks the official opening of a newly-constructed location or the start of an event. Opening ceremonies at significant events such as the Olympic Games, FIFA World Cup, and the Rugby World Cup might involve thousands of participants and be watched worldwide. Such tournaments often also include a closing ceremony at the end of the event.

Ribbon cutting
A ribbon cutting is a ceremonial event to mark the opening of a new business or a newly renovated business location. It typically involves cutting a ribbon with giant scissors, speeches and presentations by local officials and business owners, and tours of the new facilities. Members of the local community often attend the event, the local chapter of the chamber of commerce, the media, and other guests. It is seen as a celebration of the business and the community it serves.

Soft launch or opening
In the case of physical establishments, its grand opening might be preceded by a "soft opening" or "soft launch" in which the establishment begins to operate with little promotion to allow testing of operations, procedures, and facilities.

See also

 Ceremonial first pitch
 Ceremonial first puck
 Golden spike
 Groundbreaking
 Olympic Games ceremony
 Ship naming and launching
 Topping out

References

External links
 Planning Your Ribbon Cutting or Groundbreaking Ceremony

Ceremonies
Opening ceremonies
Ribbon symbolism
Rituals attending construction